La Hermandad is a Mexican drama television series produced by Claro video in collaboration with 11:11 Films & TV. It is an original idea of Rosa Clemente and Raúl Prieto. It stars Manolo Cardona as an actor and executive producer. The series revolves around Julio a man who prepares to face a revenge against an entire criminal organization within the police forces.

The first season consists of fourteen episodes premiered on June 2, 2016. On November 1, 2016 Carlos Bolado confirmed that the series would have a second season, which consists of 12 episodes.

Synopsis 
The first season tells the story of Julio Kaczinski, a prestigious psychiatrist from the Capital, who is destroyed by the violent death of his wife and daughter, for which he has become an alcoholic and mediocre forensic psychiatrist of the Federal Police Command. For a dry blow of fate, he begins to treat a patient who is part of a secret group of policemen called "La Hermandad", who do justice on their own and were the cause of their tragedy.

Cast

Main 
 Manolo Cardona as Julio Kaczinski
 Paz Vega as Luisa Salinas
 Stephanie Cayo as Milena
 Andrés Almeida as Rubén Chávez
 Rodrigo Oviedo as Daniel Acosta
 Rodrigo Murray as Florencio
 José Sefami as Manuel Navarro
 Jana Raluy as Karla Esteban
 Claudette Maillé as Ludmila Carrillo
 Ari Brickman as Iván
 Enoc Leaño as Ezequiel
 Tomás Rojas as Mario
 Mauricio Isaac as Azrael Manzilla
 Irineo Álvarez as Juan Jacinto Arias
 Gerardo Trejo Luna as Francisco
 Noé Hernández as Pedro

Recurring 
 Erik Hayser as Alejandro
 Marcela Mar as Isabela 
 Orlando Moguel as Jesús Flores
 Alejandra Ambrosi as Diana
 Ricardo Kleinbaum as Federico Zuluaga
 Carolina Sepúlveda as Rocío

Special participation 
 Olga Segura as Sara Frei
 Carlos Corona as Andrés
 Paulina Dávila as Andrea Chávez

Season 2 
 Paola Núñez as Natalia Alagón

Broadcast 
The series debuted on June 2, 2016 on the ClaroVideo digital platform. On March 5, 2017 the serie debuted on television on UniMás.

Episodes

Series overview

Season 1 (2016)

Season 2 (2017)

References

External links 

2010s Mexican television series
2016 Mexican television series debuts
Serial drama television series
Television shows set in Mexico
Claro Video original programming
2017 Mexican television series endings